The Strait of Messina is a narrow strait between the eastern tip of Sicily (Punta del Faro) and the western tip of Calabria (Punta Pezzo) in Southern Italy. It connects the Tyrrhenian Sea to the north with the Ionian Sea to the south, within the central Mediterranean.

The strait has strong tidal currents that create a unique marine ecosystem. A natural whirlpool in the northern portion of the strait has been linked to the Greek legend of Scylla and Charybdis. In some circumstances, the mirage of Fata Morgana can be observed when looking at Sicily from Calabria. With its bottleneck shape, it is also a compulsory point of transit in the migration of many bird species.

In 1957, a 220 kV overhead power line was built across the Strait of Messina. Its pylons are among the highest in the world. This power line has since been replaced by a submarine power cable, but the pylons remain and are protected as historical monuments (see Pylons of Messina).

Bird migration

The Strait of Messina is a focal point in the migrations of birds every year, who mainly cross the strait to reach their breeding grounds in northern Europe. Due to this form of bottleneck more than 300 species are recorded in the area, which is a major European hot spot for raptors, with a record of 35.000 in a spring.

Among them the European honey buzzard and the marsh harrier are the most frequent, species like Bonelli's eagle and Egyptian vulture are less frequent but regular. In the coastal salt lakes of the Strait of Messina species like glossy ibis, flamingos and black-winged stilt stop to rest. The site is also favorable for observing storks. The Monte Dinnammare and the other Peloritani mountains overlooking the Strait are a natural theatre for birdwatching.

Marine life

Due to its unique hydrogeological conditions the Strait of Messina has high levels of biodiversity and multiple endemic species. In its waters there is a strong presence of deep sea fish like the Sloane's viperfish which, due to the particular and peculiar currents of the strait, are occasionally found stranded on the shore at sunrise. The strait is also an important point of migration of many species of fish in the Mediterranean Sea.

Transportation

A ferry service connects Messina on Sicily with the mainland at Villa San Giovanni, which lies several kilometers north of the large city of Reggio Calabria; the ferries hold the cars (carriages) of the mainline train service between Palermo and Naples. There is also a hydrofoil service between Messina and Reggio Calabria.

For decades, the possibility of building a bridge across the Messina Strait has been under discussion. In 2006, under Prime Minister Romano Prodi the project was cancelled. On 6 March 2009, however, as part of a massive new public works program, Silvio Berlusconi's government announced that plans to construct the Messina Bridge had been fully revived, pledging €1.3 billion as a contribution to its estimated cost of €6.1 billion Some 3.3 km long and 60 m wide, the bridge would be supported by two 382 m pillars, each higher than the Empire State Building, and accommodate six freeway lanes, a railway (for up to 200 trains a day), and two walkways.

Supporters perceive the bridge as an opportunity for job creation and potential for an increase in tourism to the island. Opponents see it as an ecological disaster, a structure at risk due to especially strong winds and earthquakes (the area having an intense seismic record), and a potential increase in Sicilian and Calabrian organized crime. Berlusconi claimed in 2009 that work would be completed by 2016 although in February 2013, the project was cancelled again.

See also
Between Scylla and Charybdis

References

Further reading 

 Fabio Spadi (2001) "The Bridge on the Strait of Messina: 'Lowering' the Right of Innocent Passage?" International and Comparative Law Quarterly 50: 411 ff.
 "From Rome to Sicily: Plane or Train?" Expert Travel Advice, The New York Times, Feb. 7, 2008 The New York Times.

External links

 
Straits of Italy
Straits of the Mediterranean Sea
Landforms of Calabria
Landforms of Sicily
Messina
Ionian Sea
Landforms of the Tyrrhenian Sea